Giuseppe Garibaldi is an Italian aircraft carrier, the first through-deck aviation ship ever built for the Italian Navy, and the first Italian ship built to operate fixed-wing aircraft. She is equipped with short take-off and vertical landing (STOVL) aircraft and helicopters.  Giuseppe Garibaldi was involved in combat air operations off Somalia, Kosovo, Afghanistan and Libya.

Design
The Giuseppe Garibaldi is the fourth ship of the Italian Navy to be named after the 19th-century Italian General Giuseppe Garibaldi. All four ships, including the missile cruiser, together with an image of Garibaldi, are depicted in the crest.

Built by Fincantieri (Italcantieri) at the Monfalcone shipyards on the Gulf of Trieste, she was laid down on 26 March 1981, launched on 11 June 1983, and commissioned on 30 September 1985. Garibaldi is classed as an anti-submarine warfare carrier (ASW), and she is based in Taranto.

The ship is powered by four Fiat COGAG gas turbines built under license from GE, offering a sustained power of 81,000 hp (60 MW).

The ship was equipped with four Otomat Mk2 short range surface-to-surface missile system installed at the stern of the vessel (removed in 2003 to improve the flight deck and satellite communications) and two ILAS three triple tube torpedo launchers. Defences are provided by two eight-cell SAM launchers firing the SARH Aspide missile, and three Oto Melara Twin 40L70 DARDO CIWS.

The ship also has several countermeasures, including two SCLAR twenty-barrel launchers for chaff, decoy, flares, or jammers, the SLQ-25 Nixie and SLAT anti-torpedo systems and ECM systems.

The air arm consists of a maximum of sixteen AV-8B Harrier IIs and two search and rescue helicopters, or eighteen Agusta helicopters or a mix of helicopters and fighters.

A 1937 law gave control of all national fixed-wing air assets to the Italian Air Force, and the navy was only permitted to operate helicopters. At the time of the ship's commissioning of Garibaldi, the Italian Naval Aviation did not receive her Harriers, so she was reclassified as an Incrociatore portaeromobili (Italian for Aircraft carrying cruiser). Until 1988 only Italian helicopters landed on her deck, as well as Royal Navy Sea Harriers during NATO joint maneuvers. The ban on fixed-wing aircraft was lifted in 1989, and the Italian Navy acquired Harrier II fighters to fly from the Giuseppe Garibaldi.

In 2009 Giuseppe Garibaldi was replaced as the flagship of the Italian Navy by the new and larger carrier .

The ship underwent a modernization in 2003 and a major restructuring in 2013.

Combat operations

In 1999 with the Kosovo War in the Balkans, Italy committed Harrier AV-8B II+ fighters embarked aboard Giuseppe Garibaldi from 13 May to early June 1999. The planes carried out 30 sorties in 63 hours of flight. The aircraft used Mk 82 GBU-16 bombs and AGM-65 Maverick missiles.

Following the attacks of 11 September 2001 and the war on terror declared by U.S. President Bush, Italy participated in Operation Enduring Freedom in Afghanistan. Giuseppe Garibaldi was engaged as the command ship of GRUPNAVIT I, 1 Italian Shipping Group, which also included Zeffiro, the patrol team and the airman supplier in Etna. The group set sail from Taranto on 18 November 2001. They trained in the Indian Ocean from 3 December 2001 to 1 March 2002 and returned to Taranto on 18 March 2002. During the mission, the AV-8B Harrier unit carried out 288 missions for a total of 860 hours of flight. Tasks carried out included interception/interdiction, sea and air support, and aircraft interdiction in Afghanistan.

Participating in the 2011 military intervention in Libya after the transfer of authority to NATO and the decision to participate in strike air-ground operations, the Italian government assigned under NATO command four Italian Navy AV-8B plus (from Garibaldi) in addition to Italian air force aircraft. As of 24 March, the Italian Navy was engaged in Operation Unified Protector with the light aircraft carrier Garibaldi, the Maestrale-class frigate  and the auxiliary ship . In total, until the end of the mission in Libya, the eight Italian Navy AV-8Bs flying from the carrier Giuseppe Garibaldi dropped 160 guided bombs during 1221 flight hours.

See also
 Italian Naval Aviation
 
 
 List of naval ship classes in service

References

External links 

 Aircraft carrier Giuseppe Garibaldi Marina Militare website

Aircraft carriers of the Italian Navy
Ships built in Monfalcone
1983 ships
Aircraft carriers of Italy
Ships built by Fincantieri
Giuseppe Garibaldi